The Chesapeake and Ohio T-1 was a class of forty 2-10-4 steam locomotives built by the Lima Locomotive Works in Lima, Ohio in 1930 and operated until the early 1950s.

History and design
The Chesapeake and Ohio tested an Erie Railroad Berkshire locomotive, then stretched the design by adding one more driving axle, creating the 2-10-4. The T-1s were equipped with a trailing truck booster that exerted 15,275 pounds of tractive effort. They could pull the same train as a 2-8-8-2 H-7 and do it faster. The locomotives mainly operated between Russell, Kentucky to Toledo, Ohio, with a few ending up in eastern Virginia. They were rated at 13,500 tons or 160 loaded coal hoppers.

Despite their overall success, their long-wheelbase made it difficult to maintain a proper counterbalancing scheme as the drivers wore unevenly in service. Later in their careers, as their built up frames began to work lose, the T-1s rode roughly and pounded the track to the point that a special gang stood by at the bottom of one long grade to repair the damage.

In 1942, the Pennsylvania Railroad based 125 of their J1 class 2-10-4s off of the T-1s with slight modifications.

Accidents and incidents
On May 12, 1948, no. 3020 suffered a boiler explosion due to a low water level near Chillicothe, Ohio. The engineer, fireman and front brakeman were killed.

Disposition
The C&O began retiring their T-1s in 1952 in favor of diesels, and by 1953, all had been retired. None were preserved.

See also
Chesapeake and Ohio class H-8
Chesapeake and Ohio class K-4

References

Steam locomotives of the United States
T-1
Standard gauge locomotives of the United States
Freight locomotives
Lima locomotives
Scrapped locomotives
Railway locomotives introduced in 1930
2-10-4 locomotives